Antonije Đurić (21 January 1929 – 15 August 2020) was a Serbian journalist, author, historian and publicist.

Biography
He finished high school in Užice at the Užice Gymnasium. For writing against the communist regime, he was imprisoned for seven years in the Sremska Mitrovica prison at the same time as Stevan Moljević, who died in prison, Đuro Đurović, Vojin Andrić, Kosta Kumanudi, Dragić Joksimović, who also died in prison, Fr. Sava Banković and Borislav Pekić.

After his release from prison, he spent most of his working life working as a journalist for Ekspres politika.

Based on his cult drama Solunci govore, a television film of the same name was made in 1990, and he was the screenwriter of the film. He was a member of the Association of Writers of Serbia. He had a regular monthly column in the newspaper Srbija from Canada and worked as a contributor of Srpske novine from Chicago.

Antonije Đurić lived and worked in Čačak, where he died on August 15, 2020.

Published books

 Solunci govore (1982)
 Kraj morave dolina nade (1983)
 Za čast otadžbine (1985)
 Žene-Solunci govore (1987)
 Obaveštajac kaplar Miloje (1990)
 Po zapovesti Srbije (1994)
 Ravnogorci govore (1996)
 Crvena kuga trilogy (2016)
 Juriš u porobljenu otadžbinu (2016)
 Toplički ustanak (2017)

References

External links
 

1929 births
2020 deaths
People from Sjenica
Serbian journalists
Serbian non-fiction writers
20th-century Serbian historians
Serbian male writers
Yugoslav dissidents
21st-century Serbian historians
Male non-fiction writers